The Flying P-Liners were the sailing ships of the German shipping company F. Laeisz of Hamburg.

History 
The company was founded in 1824 by Ferdinand Laeisz as a hat manufacturing company. He was quite successful and distributed his hats even in South America. In 1839, he had the three-masted wooden brig Carl (named after his son) built and entered the shipping business, but lack of success made him sell the ship a short five years later.

Ferdinand's son Carl Laeisz entered the business in 1852. It was he who turned the F. Laeisz company into a shipping business. In 1857, they ordered a barque which they named Pudel (which was the nickname of Carl's wife Sophie), and from the mid-1880s on, all their ships had names starting with "P" and they became known as "the P-line". The last ship without a "P-name" was the wooden barque Henriette Behn which was stranded on the Mexican coast in 1885.
 
The Laeisz company specialized in the South American nitrate trade. Their ships were built for speed, and they soon acquired an excellent reputation for timeliness and reliability, which gave rise to the nickname "the Flying P-Line". The five-masted barque  made the voyage from Chile to England around Cape Horn in 1904 in just 57 days, a record at the time.

The Laeisz company had some of the largest sailing ships ever built. However, these ships turned out to be too big: their crews did not like them, and it became increasingly difficult to achieve a satisfactory utilization on the outbound leg from Europe to Chile.

During World War I, many of Laeisz' ships were blocked in Chilean ports and had to be handed over as war reparations. However, the Laeisz company was able to re-acquire many ships after the war and put them into service again.

Towards the end of the 1920s, the company began pulling out of the nitrate trade and increasingly started transporting other goods, e.g. bananas. They also sold some of their older ships, for instance  to Gustav Erikson in Finland who already had acquired the former Norddeutscher Lloyd-ship . Subsequently, the Laeisz company only ordered steamships.

Ships 

Four of the Flying P-Liners still exist today:
  is a museum ship in Mariehamn, Finland.
 Peking is a museum ship in Hamburg, Germany.
 Passat is a museum ship in Lübeck's sea resort Travemünde, Germany.
 Padua is the only ship still active: she is today a school ship and sails as  under a Russian flag.

Other famous Flying P-Liners were a five-masted barque and a five-masted full-rigged ship (both built by Joh. C. Tecklenborg ship yard in Geestemünde)
 Potosi, (barque) built 1895, sold 1923, caught fire and sunk off Argentina in 1925
 Preussen II, (full-rigged ship) built 1902, beached in 1910 after being rammed by a steamer
and the four-masted barques 
 , built 1905, capsized and sunk in 1957, 80 died, 6 rescued.
 , built 1892, stranded 1912 South Shetlands
 , built 1892, stranded in Norfolk 1905
 , built 1903 in Italy, scrapped 1936
 , built 1917, giving to the Chilean navy, in 1943 as it was in Valparaiso when the Chilean government declared war on Germany, later became the Chilean Navy schoolship Lautaro, which was caught by fire in his way to Mexico and sunk off the coast of Peru in 1945.
 , built 1902, after an accident in 1936 was scrapped in 1938

Other P-Line ships were:
 Pudel, built 1857, sunk 1870
 Palmyra, steel full-rigged ship built in 1889 by Blohm & Voss, Hamburg. Stranded on the Wellington Islands on the South Chilean coast 2 July 1908. The captain and the first mate were able to reach shore but the rest of the crew of 21 men disappeared in one of the lifeboats.
 Pera, built 1890, torpedoed 1917
 Pitlochry, built 1894, sunk 1913 in the English Channel
 Preussen I, built 1902, sunk in South Atlantic 1909
 Pellworm, built 1902, sunk 1944
 Pangani, built 1903, sunk 1913
 Penang, built 1905, torpedoed 1940

The Laeisz shipping company still exists today, operating many freighters under traditional names.

See also
 List of large sailing vessels

References

External links
 Homepage of the F. Laeisz shipping company today.
  Krusenshtern ex Padua
 Video of passage around the horn with Peking in 1928.

Individual sailing vessels
Shipping companies of Germany
Tall ships of Germany
Companies established in 1824
Laeisz family
1824 establishments in Germany
Windjammers